Texas's 16th congressional district of the United States House of Representatives includes almost all of El Paso and most of its suburbs in the state of Texas. The current Representative is Democrat Veronica Escobar.

The district was initially created in 1903. For most of the next six decades, it stretched across , from El Paso in the west to the Permian Basin (Midland and Odessa) in the east. However, after Texas' original 1960 district map was thrown out as a result of Wesberry v. Sanders, the 16th was shrunk down to the city of El Paso (except a sliver in the east) and most of its surrounding suburban communities.

Since the 1990s, the 16th has been the only Democratic bastion in heavily Republican West Texas. While it has been a majority-Hispanic district since the 1970s, only two Hispanics have ever represented it, Silvestre Reyes and Escobar.

Election results from presidential races

List of members representing the district

Recent elections

2006

2008

2010

2012

2014

2016

2018

2020

2022

Historical district boundaries

See also

List of United States congressional districts

References

 Congressional Biographical Directory of the United States 1774–present

15